Bandhagen metro station is on the Green line of the Stockholm metro, located in Bandhagen, Söderort. The station was inaugurated on 22 November 1954 as part of the extension from Stureby to Högdalen. The distance to Slussen is 6.5 km.

A southerly extension of the Blue line of the Stockholm metro is currently under construction and expected to be opened for the passengers in 2030. As part of this development, the Blue line will take over this station.

References

External links
Images of Bandhagen

Green line (Stockholm metro) stations
Railway stations opened in 1954